Bolghar was intermittently the capital of Volga Bulgaria from the 10th to the 15th centuries, along with Bilyar and Nur-Suvar. It was situated on the bank of the Volga River, about 30 km downstream from its confluence with the Kama River and some 130 km from modern Kazan in what is now Spassky District. West of it lies a small modern town, since 1991 known as Bolgar. The UNESCO World Heritage Committee inscribed Bolgar Historical and Archaeological Complex (ancient Bolghar hill fort) to the World Heritage List in 2014.

History 
The city is supposed to have been the capital of Volga Bulgaria from as early as the 10th century. Regular Russian incursions along the Volga, and internecine fights, forced the Volga Bulgar kings (khagans) to intermittently move their capital to Bilyar. After a destruction of Bilyar during the Mongol invasion, the older capital became a centre of a separate province (or duchy) within the Golden Horde. During the period of Mongol domination Bolgar acquired immense wealth and many imposing buildings and grew tenfold in size.

The Tokhtamysh–Timur war saw a marked decline in its fortunes. It was sacked by Bulaq-Temir in 1361 and endangered by Timur. As a Muslim religious center Bolgar persevered until the mid-16th century when the Khanate of Kazan was conquered by the Russian Tsar Ivan IV and incorporated into the Russian state.

During Tsarist rule the site of the ancient town was settled by Russian commoners. Tsar Peter the Great issued a special ukase to preserve the surviving ruins, which was the first Russian law aimed at preserving historical heritage.

Little pilgrimage 
During the Soviet period, Bolgar was a center of a local Islamic movement known as The Little Hajj; Muslims from Tatarstan and other parts of the Soviet Union could not participate in the hajj to Mecca, so they travelled instead to Bolgar.

Monuments and temples

Importance 

The Tatars refer to the medieval capital of Volga Bolgaria as Shahri Bolghar, that is Persian for "the City of Bolghar". The town is part of their cultural heritage, because Volga Bulgaria is the predecessor state of the Khanate of Kazan, which in turn is in a way the predecessor of today's Russian republic of Tatarstan.

Today, the capital of Tatarstan is Kazan, but many Tatars consider Bolghar to be their ancient and religious capital and to allow a glimpse of Muslim Bulgar life before the Mongol invasion of Volga Bulgaria.

References
Edward Tracy Turnerelli, Kazan, the Ancient Capital of the Tartar Khans, 1854, pp 196-261

External links 
 

Populated places on the Volga
Defunct towns in Russia
Islam in Russia
Archaeological sites in Tatarstan
Volga Bulgaria
Former populated places in Russia
World Heritage Sites in Russia
Cultural heritage monuments of federal significance in Tatarstan

bg:Болгар (град)